Strickler is a surname that refers to:
 (1887–1963), co-author of the Gauckler–Manning–Strickler formula
Amelia Strickler (born 1994), British shot putter
Bub Strickler (1938-2005), former NASCAR Cup Series driver
Cyrus W. Strickler (1907–1998), American college football coach
Daniel B. Strickler (1897–1992), American politician from Pennsylvania; lieutenant governor 1947–51
Dave Strickler (born 1944), American reference librarian
Dave Strickler (drag racer), American drag racer
George Strickler (1904–1976), American sports writer
Jacob Strickler (1770–1842), American artist
Kristo Strickler (born 1998), American soccer player
Kyle Strickler (born 1983), American NASCAR driver
Matt Strickler, American politician
René Strickler (born 1962), Argentine-Mexican actor
Susan Strickler, American television and theater director
Will Strickler (born 1986), American professional golfer
Yancey Strickler (born 1978), American entrepreneur, Kickstarter co-founder

See also
Places
Strickler, Arkansas, an unincorporated community, United States
Strickler, Pennsylvania, an unincorporated community, United States
Stricklerstown, Pennsylvania, an unincorporated community, United States